Summerall is a surname. Notable people with the surname include:

Charles Pelot Summerall (1867–1955), United States Army general
The Summerall Guards
Pat Summerall (1930–2013), American football player and sports announcer